The Cat Who Turned On and Off is the third novel in a series of murder mystery novels by Lilian Jackson Braun.

Plot introduction 
Qwill and his two lovable Siamese, Koko and Yum Yum find themselves in a rundown section of the city known as Junktown.  Expecting it to be a haven of dopers and the homeless, they are surprised to see that it is a collection of old antique stores trying to survive.  They also find mystery and murder waiting for them.  A mysterious fall ends the life of one of Junktown's leading citizens and Qwill suspects it was no accident.  It takes Koko to prove him right.

1968 novels
Turned On and Off
Novels about cats